Apševci is a village in Syrmia in easternmost part of Croatia along the state border with Serbia. It is administratively part of the Nijemci Municipality, the largest municipality by territory in the county. The population of the village at the time of 2011 census was 305.

Name
The name of the village in Croatian is plural.

References

Populated places in Vukovar-Syrmia County
Populated places in Syrmia